Blue Mode is the third album by American organist Reuben Wilson recorded in 1969 and released by the Blue Note label the following year. The album was also released by Vee-Jay Records as Organ Talk in 1974.

Reception
The Allmusic review by Stephen Thomas Erlewine awarded the album 4½ stars and stated "If Love Bug skirted the edges of free jazz and black power, Blue Mode embraces soul-jazz and Memphis funk in no uncertain terms... they know how to work a groove, and that's what makes Blue Mode a winner".

Track listing
All compositions by Reuben Wilson except where noted
 "Bambu" (Melvin Sparks) - 8:03
 "Knock on Wood" (Steve Cropper, Eddie Floyd) - 6:09
 "Bus Ride" - 6:19
 "Orange Peel" - 6:36
 "Twenty-Five Miles" (Johnny Bristol, Harvey Fuqua, Edwin Starr) - 7:11
 "Blue Mode" - 7:26

Personnel
Reuben Wilson - organ
John Manning - tenor saxophone
Melvin Sparks - guitar
Tommy Derrick - drums

References

Blue Note Records albums
Reuben Wilson albums
1970 albums
Albums recorded at Van Gelder Studio
Albums produced by Francis Wolff